

List of the Navy of the Ukrainian People's Republic ships 

On October 17, 1917, the 2nd rank Captain Ye.Akimov was appointed the representative of the Central Council of Ukraine at the command of the Black Sea Fleet. In November 1917, the Sahaidachny Sea Battalion (kurin) was established in Sevastopol, which, on November 24, 1917, was sent to Kiev and participated in the Kiev Arsenal January Uprising. On December 29, 1917, most of the Black Sea Fleet sided with the Bolsheviks. Earlier, in December 1917, the Ukrainian squadron led by the Russian battleship Imperator Aleksandr III, including another cruiser and three destroyers, participated in the evacuation of the 127th Infantry Division from Trebizond back to Ukraine.

Baltic Fleet 
 Soviet cruiser Krasny Krym (October 12, 1917)
 Russian destroyer Ukraina (October 12, 1917)
 Russian destroyer Haidamak (October 12, 1917)

Black Sea Fleet 
 Russian battleship Georgii Pobedonosets (November 9, 1917)
 Soviet cruiser Pamiat Merkuria (November 12, 1917)
 Russian destroyer Zorkiy (November 12, 1917)
 Russian destroyer Zvonkiy (November 12, 1917)
 Russian battleship Imperator Aleksandr III (November 22, 1917)
 Russian battleship Imperatritsa Ekaterina Velikaya

Vessels captured during the Russian annexation of Crimea (2014) 
List of captured ships of the Ukrainian Navy (at least 100 vessels). On 8 April 2014, an agreement had been reached between Russia and Ukraine to return captured vessels to Ukraine and "for the withdrawal of an undisclosed number of Ukrainian aircraft seized in Crimea". At the time, Russian naval sources claimed that the Ukrainian ships were "not operational because they are old, obsolete, and in poor condition". Four combatant ships (a Grisha corvette, a Polnocny small landing ship, a Yevgenya minesweeper, and a Matka ex-missile boat) and 31 various auxiliary vessels were returned to Ukraine by June 2014 at the latest; at least 9 vessels were not returned, but scrapped. All vessels returned were in service at their time of capture; all but one of the vessels (U926) confirmed to have been scrapped were decommissioned at their time of capture.

Vessels lost and captured during the Russo-Ukrainian War (2022)

Decommissioned and sold ships

Never completed

Miscellaneous

List of ship classes 
Submarine
 Foxtrot-class submarine
 Triton-2-class midget submarine
Frigates
 Krivak-class frigate
 (Petya-class frigate)
Corvettes
 Tarantul-class corvette
 Grisha-class corvette
 Pauk-class corvette
Fast attack craft
 Matka-class missile boat
Patrol
 Island-class patrol boat
 Gyurza-M-class patrol boat
 Zhuk-class patrol boat
 Flamingo-class anti-sabotage craft
Landing craft
 Ropucha-class landing ship tank
 Alligator-class landing ship
 Zubr-class LCAC
 project 1785-class small landing craft
 Centaur-LK-class fast assault craft
Mine warfare
 Sonya-class minesweeper
 Natya-class minesweeper
 Yevgenya-class minesweeper
 T43-class minesweeper
Auxiliary vessels
 Boris Chilikin-class fleet oiler
 Amur-class command/search and rescue ship
 Bambuk-class command ship
 Sorum-class tugboat

Notes

References 

Ukrainian Navy
Ukrainian Navy
Ships of Ukraine